In Christian theology, dyophysitism (Greek: δυοφυσιτισμός, from δυο (dyo), meaning "two" and φύσις (physis), meaning "nature") is the Christological position that two natures, divine and human, co-exist in the unique person of Jesus Christ God.

According to saint Athanasius of Alexandria, Jesus was true man and true God.


Beliefs 

Dyophysite Christians believe that there is complete and perfect unity of the two natures in one hypostasis and one person of Jesus Christ. For the Chalcedonians, the hypostatic union was the center of Jesus's unity (his divinity and humanity being described as natures) whereas those who rejected the Chalcedonian definition saw his nature as the point of unity. The miaphysites upheld the idea of one nature in Christ based on their understanding of Cyril of Alexandria's Twelve Anathemas, namely number 4 which states "If anyone shall divide between two persons or subsistences those expressions which are contained in the Evangelical and Apostolical writings, or which have been said concerning Christ by the Saints, or by himself, and shall apply some to him as to a man separate from the Word of God, and shall apply others to the only Word of God the Father, on the ground that they are fit to be applied to God: let him be anathema." Since the term dyophysitism is used for describing the Chalcedonian positions, it has a distinctive opposite meaning to the terms monophysite (the notion that Christ has only one, divine nature) and miaphysite (the notion that Christ is both divine and human, but in one nature).

Dyophisitism has also been used to describe some aspects of Nestorianism, the doctrines ascribed to Nestorius of Constantinople. It is now generally agreed that some of his ideas were not far from those that eventually emerged as orthodox, but the orthodoxy of his formulation of the doctrine of Christ is still controversial among churches.

The belief in Jesus Christ being true Man and true God was embedded in the Chalcedonian Creed.

Spread 
Development of dyophysite Christology was gradual; Dyophysitism tradition and its complex terminology were finally formulated as a result of long Christological debates that were constant during the 4th and 5th centuries. The importance of dyophysitism was often emphasized by prominent representatives of the Antiochene School. After many debates and several councils, dyophysitism gained its official ecclesiastical form at the Fourth Ecumenical Council, held in Chalcedon in 451. 

The Chalcedonian Definition became the basis for the Christological doctrine of the two natures of Jesus Christ, which is held up to the present day by a majority of Christian churches, including: the Eastern Orthodox Church, the Roman Catholic Church, Eastern Catholic Churches, the Anglican Church, the Old Catholic Church, as well as Reformed, Lutheran and various other Christian denominations. This definition states that Christ is One Person and One Hypostasis in Two Natures. Apart from that, the ancient Church of the East has preserved dyophysite Christology and other traditions of the Antiochene School.

See also
First Council of Ephesus
Miaphysitism
Monophysitism
Nestorianism
Oriental Orthodoxy
Second Council of Constantinople

References

Citations

Sources 

 
 
 
 

Christian terminology
Christology
Eastern Orthodox theology
Schisms in Christianity
Nature of Jesus Christ